Saint Kitts and Nevis requires its residents to register their motor vehicles and display vehicle registration plates. Current plates are North American standard 6 × 12 inches (152 × 300 mm).

References

Saint Kitts and Nevis
Transport in Saint Kitts and Nevis
Saint Kitts and Nevis-related lists